Dennis Mark Malaska (born January 17, 1978 in Youngstown, Ohio) is an American former professional baseball pitcher who played for the Tampa Bay Devil Rays in  and the Boston Red Sox in  in Major League Baseball. Malaska grew up on the south side of Youngstown, Ohio. He attended Cardinal Mooney High School where he earned three varsity letters in both baseball and basketball, earned All-Steel Valley honors in both sports, and was later inducted into the school's athletic Hall of Fame. Malaska was offered several athletic scholarships in both sports as well as several academic scholarships, but chose to continue his baseball career at The University of Akron.

Malaska attended the University of Akron (1997–2000), where he set and still holds Akron single-game records for runs (5), doubles (3), and RBIs (10). He also garnered back-to-back Best Pro Prospect honors in the New England Collegiate Baseball League (1998 and 1999) while playing center field for the Danbury Westerners (Danbury, Connecticut.) He would later be inducted into the New England Collegiate Baseball League Hall of Fame in 2010 as part of its inaugural class and have his number retired by the Westerners in 2014. In the spring of 2000, Malaska was developed into a relief pitcher at the University of Akron because of the team's need for a closer. He finished the 2000 NCAA season with a .326 batting average and a 1.13 ERA earning him All Mid-American Conference First Team honors. He was drafted in the 8th round of the 2000 MLB draft by the Tampa Bay Devil Rays. A year after being drafted, he tied for the organizational lead in strikeouts, and in 2002 led the organization in complete games. He made his Major League debut with the Tampa Bay Devil Rays in 2003 and posted a 2.81 ERA in 22 appearances out of the bullpen, becoming only the third player in University of Akron history to reach the major leagues. He was acquired off waivers by the Boston Red Sox after the 2003 season and received a World Series ring as a member of the 2004 Boston Red Sox after 19 appearances out of their bullpen.

Honors and awards
1998 New England Collegiate Baseball League All Star
1998 New England Collegiate Baseball League Best Pro Prospect
1999 New England Collegiate Baseball League All Star
1999 New England Collegiate Baseball League All Star Game MVP
1999 New England Collegiate Baseball League Best Pro Prospect
2000 All Mid-American Conference First Team
2002 Baseball America Tampa Bay Devil Rays #29 Rated Prospect
2002 California League All Star
2003 Baseball America Boston Red Sox #25 Rated Prospect
World Series Champion (2004)
2010 New England Collegiate Baseball League Hall of Fame Inductee

References

External links

1978 births
Living people
Major League Baseball pitchers
Baseball players from Youngstown, Ohio
Tampa Bay Devil Rays players
Boston Red Sox players
Hudson Valley Renegades players
Durham Bulls players
Akron Zips baseball players
Pawtucket Red Sox players
Charleston RiverDogs players
Bakersfield Blaze players
Orlando Rays players